Mys-Tech is a fictional organisation appearing in American comic books published by Marvel Comics. They were depicted as a shadowy Faustian organisation who acted as the main villains in a range of initially successful but short-lived comics launched in the US by Marvel UK in the 1990s.  Some of these stories also were published in anthology form in the UK in the Marvel UK comic Overkill.

They first appeared in Warheads #1 (June 1992) and were created by John Freeman, Nick Vince, Gary Erskine, and John Beeston.

Fictional origins
The board of Mys-Tech, a multinational corporation, were originally seven mages who in 987 sold their souls to the demon Mephisto in exchange for immortality.  The Mys-Tech board members must provide a steady stream of souls to the demon otherwise they will breach their contract and their own souls will be forfeit.  Over the years the board accumulated power and wealth and in the modern age this power and wealth became a business empire.

Board members
The seven mages who became the board of Mys-Tech were:
Algernon Crowe
Bronwen Gryffn
Ranulph Haldane
Eadmund Porlock
Brendan Rathcoole
Gudrun Tyburn
Ormond Wychwood

Headquarters
Mys-Tech operated as a respectable business but hidden beneath one of their front organisations, The Museum of Pagan Antiquities at Canary Wharf in London they had constructed a fantastic underground headquarters.  These headquarters were used to house the arcane magical technologies the board used to increase their power and keep the supply of souls flowing to Mephisto.  Chief amongst these was the Un-Earth, a macabre microcosm of the planet used in a similar fashion to a voodoo doll.  The headquarters also housed extensive biotech labs.  It was in one of these labs that the genetically engineered assassin named Julius Mullarkey, also known as Killpower, was created by Mys-Tech scientist Dr. Oonagh Mullarkey.  The headquarters were also the base for the Warheads, Mys-Tech's mercenaries who travel through wormholes collecting sophisticated technology for their masters.

Enemies
Mys-Tech featured as villains in many of the titles launched by Marvel UK in their 1990s US expansion.  The characters featured in these titles included Dark Angel (previously known as Hell's Angel), Death's Head, the partners Motormouth and Killpower, and the Knights of Pendragon.  The Warheads Kether Troop also later went on to rebel against their masters.

The scarred cyborg Badhand has confronted Mys-Tech forces multiple times. Notably, he has spied on the Warheads, allied himself with Nick Fury and assisted Cable with a theft from Mys-Tech's vaults.

Mys-Tech also came up against other Marvel Universe characters such as the X-Men, although they never appeared outside of the Marvel UK imprint.

Mys-Tech War and More
In the mini-series Mys-Tech Wars (1993), by Dan Abnett and Bryan Hitch, their forces fought most of the Marvel Universe's assembled heroes. In the resulting demonic invasion, many of Earth's heroes (including a majority of the Avengers, Fantastic Four, X-Men, Spider-Man, Ghost Rider, and Nick Fury) were slaughtered. However, due to the surviving heroes' efforts, the entire event was erased from history. As such, only a few, such as Doctor Strange, Professor X, and Motormouth, actually remember what had happened.

In a later attempt to destroy all superheroes, the board transform themselves into younger versions. In the same issue, they cause the formation of a psychic being that is the result of their centuries of malice. It is called the 'Anti-Being'. They try to team up in a bid to dominate all reality but lose the being to the cyborg Death's Head.

They're mentioned in a Spitfire one-off as still around.

Finally, they attempted to get out of their contract with Mephisto by sending all of Britain to Hell. The country's heroes fought them back at the Battle of London Bridge (later covered up) and took the Museum of Pagan Antiquities, sending the board to Hell instead and leaving the group seemingly gone for good. S.H.I.E.L.D. stepped in to handle the clean-up, keeping MI:13 out of the loop so they could hoard the technology for themselves. Years later, various Mys-Tech bases went active again and it was believed the group was returning; it turned out instead to be a hell-warped Killpower leading a second demonic invasion, all an elaborate move by Mephisto to end all his Mys-Tech contracts and return all the energies he had tied up in abandoned bases and weaponry.

References

External links
Mys-Tech at the Appendix to the Handbook of the Marvel Universe

Mys-Tech at the International Catalogue of Superheroes
Mys-Tech at the Marvel Directory

Mys-Tech Wars at the Big Comic Book DataBase
 

1993 comics debuts
Marvel UK teams
Marvel UK titles

mi:MI-13 (comics)